IntelliScanner Corporation is a North Carolina-based hardware and software company that specializes in barcode enabled organizational products for home and business use. IntelliScanner is known for their use of barcode technology and Internet-enabled software to automatically enter information on media items, wine and groceries, as well as utilizing barcodes to allow users to organize other types of items with or without a barcode.

IntelliScanner is perhaps best known for its bundling of software and hardware - a practice that has been met with praise for all-in-one convenience and criticism from customers who already own a scanner and would prefer to only buy software.
IntelliScanner's software and hardware products run on Mac OS X and Microsoft Windows operating systems. IntelliScanner is a subsidiary of Apparent Corporation.

Product list
IntelliScanner mini: media, wine, grocery, and home asset organization.
IntelliScanner SOHO: small business organization scanner with inventory software.
Wine Collector 200: wine collection management.
Daneizo Lending Management System: software and scanner package for book and library management.
IntelliScanner Pro: business & educational-class tethered USB barcode reader.
IntelliScanner Asset Tags: self-adhesive barcode tags.

References

The New York Times, October 27, 2005 - Circuits; You'll Never Lose That Chateauneuf du Pape 1994 Again Review of Wine Collector
MyMac.com, Wednesday, June 15, 2005 - Review of Wine Collector 1.0, by David Weeks, Columnist/Reviewer

External links

Macintosh software companies
Software companies based in North Carolina
Companies based in Cary, North Carolina
Software companies of the United States